Grande Côte is a stretch of coastline in the West African country of Senegal.

Grande Côte or Grand Cote, may also refer to:

 Montée de la Grande Côte, a street of La Croix-Rousse quarter in Lyon, France
 Grande Côte, a Chablis cru vineyard
Grand Cote National Wildlife Refuge, a waterfowl refuge in Avoyelles Parish, Louisiana, United States

See also

Grand Coteau (disambiguation)
Grande (disambiguation)